The 2008 Giro d'Italia Femminile, or Giro Donne, was the 19th running of the Giro d'Italia Femminile, one of the premier events of the women's road cycling calendar. It was held over nine stages from 5–13 July 2008.

Route and stages

General classification

Sources

Giro d'Italia Femminile
Giro d'Italia Femminile
Giro d'talia Fem